The 1855 Texas gubernatorial election was held on August 6, 1855 to elect the governor of Texas. Incumbent Governor Elisha M. Pease was reelected to a second term, winning 57% of the vote.

Results

Results

References

1855 United States gubernatorial elections
Gubernatorial
1855
August 1855 events